Buried Alive: Live in Maryland is a live album by The New Barbarians. It was recorded at the Capital Centre in Landover, Maryland on May 5, 1979 during the band's only concert tour.

Track listing

Disc 1
 "Sweet Little Rock N Roller" (Chuck Berry) – 4:20
 "Buried Alive" (Ron Wood) – 6:27
 "F.U.C. Her" (Ron Wood) – 4:48
 "Mystifies Me" (Ron Wood) – 5:37
 "Infekshun" (Ron Wood) – 4:56
 "Rock Me Baby" (Big Bill Broonzy, Arthur Crudup) – 6:04
 "Sure the One You Need" (Keith Richards, Ron Wood), (Lead vocal Keith Richards) – 4:49
 "Lost & Lonely" (Ron Wood) – 4:29
 "Love in Vain" (Robert Johnson) – 8:38
 "Breathe on Me" (Ron Wood) – 10:23

Disc 2
 "Let's Go Steady" (Arthur Alexander), (Lead vocal Keith Richards) – 3:25
 "Apartment No. 9" (Johnny Paycheck, Bobby Austin), (Lead vocal Keith Richards) – 4:13
 "Honky Tonk Women" (Mick Jagger, Keith Richards) – 5:50
 "Worried Life Blues" (Major Merryweather), (Lead vocal Keith Richards) – 4:07
 "I Can Feel the Fire" (Ron Wood) – 6:44
 "Come to Realise" (Ron Wood) – 5:11
 "Am I Grooving You?" (Bert Russell, Jeff Barry) – 9:39
 "Seven Days" (Bob Dylan) – 6:03
 "Before They Make Me Run" (Jagger, Richards), (Lead vocal Keith Richards) – 3:23
 "Jumpin' Jack Flash" (Jagger, Richards) – 7:38

Personnel
 Ronnie Wood – guitar, harmonica, pedal steel guitar, lead and backing vocals
 Keith Richards – guitar, piano, backing and lead vocals
 Stanley Clarke – bass guitar
 Zigaboo Modeliste – drums
 Ian McLagan – piano, organ, backing vocals
 Bobby Keys – saxophone

References

The New Barbarians (band) albums
2006 live albums